Grays Landing Lock and Dam, previously known as Lock and Dam Number 7, is one of nine navigational structures on the Monongahela River between Pittsburgh, Pennsylvania and Fairmont, West Virginia. It is located at river mile 82.

There is one lock chamber on the left descending bank of the river at the dam. The reservoir formed by the dam is also a municipal and industrial water supply. The structure is the third on the site. Originally, an 1880s stone masonry structure sat in this location; it was replaced in 1923 by a modern dam.

See also
List of crossings of the Monongahela River

References

Crossings of the Monongahela River
United States Army Corps of Engineers, Pittsburgh District
Dams in Pennsylvania
Buildings and structures in Greene County, Pennsylvania
Buildings and structures in Fayette County, Pennsylvania
Transportation buildings and structures in Fayette County, Pennsylvania
Transportation buildings and structures in Greene County, Pennsylvania
United States Army Corps of Engineers dams
Dams completed in 1995